is a Japanese light novel series by Koroku Inumura. It is set in the same fictional universe as Inumura's earlier light novel The Princess and the Pilot. Five volumes were published between 2009 and 2011 by Shogakukan under their Gagaga Bunko imprint. An anime television series by TMS Entertainment aired in Japan from January to March 2014. A manga adaptation was serialized in Shogakukan's Shōnen Sunday Super from February 2014 to September 2015.

Characters

Main characters
 

Kal-el is the former crown prince of the Balsteros Empire, Prince Karl La Hire, whose monarchy was overthrown by the Wind Revolution. While imprisoned with his mother, seeing a plane flying in the sky cemented his aspiration to become a pilot. After a month in the prison, he was adopted by Michael Albus. Due to unpleasant memories of the Wind Revolution, he has an absolute hatred towards Nina Viento. He enters Cadoques High's Aerial Division along with Ariel. He falls in love with Claire Cruz at first sight. After discovering that Claire is actually Nina Viento, his feelings become conflicted. When he remembers his mother's words "to forgive rather than hate", he lets go of all hatred he had for Nina.

 

Claire is a girl with the power to control wind and was called a witch by people around her because of it. She joined the Wind Revolution as Nina Viento and helped defeat the forces of the Balsteros Empire, but lost her powers in doing so. She later hides her identity as Nina and joins Cadoques High's Aerial Division, where she is Kal-el's flying partner. She falls in love with Kal-el, but is conflicted after realizing he is Karl La Hire. During the final battle with the Sky Clan, she regains her powers. As part of the treaty with the Sky Clan, she is taken to the Holy Spring in order to fulfill their prophecy.

Ariel is the youngest daughter of Kal-el's adopted family. She is younger than him by one day, but often calls him her younger brother. Due to an injury suffered during a clash with the Sky Clan, she quits pilot school and decides to become a mechanic. She is revealed to have romantic feelings for Kal-el.

Ignacio is the son of former King Gregorio La Hire's concubine, and is thus Kal-el's half-brother. Before the Wind Revolution, he and his mother were expelled from the palace, and she died one month later. Due to this, Ignacio swore revenge on the royal family. He becomes Ariel's flying partner in the flight school by default. He often acts cold and aloof, for which Ariel calls him a tsundere. He is Nina Viento's bodyguard and has been since he was a child.

Cadoques High, Aerial Division students

 More commonly referred to as "Noripii" by his friends, he is Nanako's flying partner. A very loud and energetic person. He is from the same town as Nanako, and is hinted to have feelings for her. His friends jokingly proclaim he is "the best at running away", but despite his fears he volunteers to escort a recon mission in Episode 11, which he barely survives.

 Called Benji by his peers, though mostly by Sharon. He is a calm and level-headed person, and, according to Claire, his school grades are very high. His flying partner is his childhood friend, Sharon, with whom he develops a romantic relationship. His right arm is lost in the battle in episode 11, though he is saved from death by blood loss thanks to an aviator's scarf given to him by Sharon.

 A heavy-set student and intelligent pilot. Known as an "Airplane Otaku" by his peers, he shows incomparable knowledge of aircraft and their associated hardware such as machine guns. His flying partner is Chiharu de Lucia, whom he is in love with. He dies in battle in episode 7, after being grievously wounded while attempting to mark targets for an allied bomber squadron, and then using his plane as a decoy after forcing Chiharu to bail out.

 Mitsuo's flying partner, serving as the pilot with Mitsuo navigating. She often refers to him as Micchan (Mitty), and thinks very highly of his aviation knowledge. After Mitsuo's death, she suffers heavily from depression and post-traumatic stress. She personally delivers Mitsuo's medal of honor to his parents after graduation.

 Benjamin's flying partner. She is a kind and gentle girl. She is Benjamin's childhood friend, with whom she is romantically involved.

 Noriaki's flying partner. She is very cheerful and always smiles. She is from the same town as he is and is hinted to have feelings for him.

 Very tall and kind person. Although he looked like an adult, he was actually the same age as his classmates. He wants to become a pilot to help support his numerous siblings. His flying partner is Marco, who pilots the aircraft with Wolfgang as navigator/gunner. He dies in battle in episode 8, while attempting to cover the retreat of surviving members of his class.

 Wolfgang's flying partner/pilot, an immature kid who looks up to Wolfgang like an older brother. He is injured in battle in episode 8, when his plane's engines are disabled by a Sky Clan fighter, and Wolfgang was killed.

 The son of Leopold Melze, who is of royal blood. Because of his noble status, he is very cocky, and had a standing rivalry with Kal-el over the right to be Claire's flying partner. However, when Isla was threatened by the Sky Clan's enormous air fleet, he sets his differences aside and works with Kal-el to defend the flying island. In episode 8 he dies in battle along with his pilot, when a Sky Clan fighter intercepts them.

Cadoques High, Aerial Division teachers

The hot-blooded, "macho" instructor of the "commoner" Centezual flight class. He comes off as arrogant and selfish, and has a surprising tolerance for pain as evidenced by laughing off a punch to the ribs (and yet not a kick in the shins). Juan cares very deeply about his students, going so far as trying to throw technicians off a plane so they wouldn't force students to go onto the battlefield, as well as flying into a war zone alone and unarmed to search for survivors.

The cool-headed, professional instructor of the Van Whyl flight class, who comes from the lesser nobility. Juan and Sonia appear to have a mutual respect for each other, but she has a very limited tolerance for his inflated ego. She aids Juan in rescuing Chiharu de Lucia after her plane is shot down, but resigns soon after, when Commander Melze orders the students of Cadoques back into battle.

Congress of Isla

Isla's navigation officer, and old friend of Instructor Bandereas, Luis serves as a sort of mentor/foster father towards Claire. He convinced Claire to take up the position as Governor of Isla, and in exchange made arrangements for her to attend the flight school there. Luis is also one of the major reasons Claire was able to continue attending the school, despite Countess Ulshyrra's efforts.

Commander of the flying battleship Luna Barcos, de facto leader of Isla's military, and father of Fausto. After the initial encounters with the Sky Clan, he underestimates their tactics and equipment, ultimately leading to disastrous losses later on, including the death of his son. He has to order the Cadoques students into battle, pressing their training planes into service as ersatz fighters, which he deeply regrets but sees no alternative.

Isla's Foreign Affairs adviser, though roughly serving as Luis's adjutant and adviser, Amelia takes her job extremely seriously, feeling that humor has no place in it. She is one of the first Isla officers to speak with a Sky Clan pilot, and discovers that their language was very similar.

Isla's Finance Minister, who deals with the day-to-day operations of the civilian side of Isla.

Kal-el's family

Michael is Ariel's biological, and Kal-el's adoptive, father. He had been serving the new Republican government of Balsteros as a mechanic, and was present on the day of Maria La Hire's execution. Finding Kal-el after he had escaped from his jail cell, and seeing the boy's malnourished state, Michael took it upon himself to rescue the boy from his miserable fate and give him a place in his home.

Noelle is the eldest daughter of the Albus family. She later marries a man named Pedro, and has a child.

Manuelle is the second eldest daughter of the Albus family whose hair is the same color as Ariel's.

Gregorio was Kal-el's father and the former king of the Balsteros Empire, who was overthrown and executed during the Wind Revolution.

Maria was Kal-el's mother who was imprisoned alongside her son in the aftermath of the Wind Revolution. She was held in custody for a considerable time after her husband's execution before her own was carried out. Before the coup and her subsequent imprisonment, Maria was a pilot (though whether in a recreational or military context is not known), and was a big influence in Kal-el's desire to become a pilot.

Others

Claire's appointed Guardian, and a sort of "wicked stepmother" figure in her life. The Countess forces Claire to adhere to a very strict schedule and curfew, in order for her to fulfill her ceremonial duties as Nina Viento. She has threatened to pull Claire from the flight school numerous times when she felt it was interfering with her official duties. Claire is ultimately removed from the school after the first Sky Clan raids against Isla but this was due solely to Claire's emotional conflict over her role in the Wind Revolution and her feelings towards Kal-el driving her into giving up her identity, and fully becoming Nina Viento, not to the Countess' efforts.

A student of Cadoques High School, though not a pilot. She has a very unsettling tendency to arrive when least expected, almost as though from thin air, and at awkward times.

Holy Levamme Empire

A blue single seater aircraft belonging to the Holy Levamme Empire piloted with great skills. It has been confirmed in Toaru Hikūshi e no Yasōkyoku that it's piloted by Charles Karino from The Princess and the Pilot.

High consul of the Holy Levamme Empire, supportive of the alliance between Balsteros and Levamme in order to defeat the Sky Clan.

Commander of Levamme's Holy Spring mission, leading their flagship El Basstel.

Sky Clan

A mysterious pilot of the Sky Clan, encountered multiple times through the series. The pilot, and their squadron, were equipped with enhanced versions of the Sky Clan's standard fighters, and had a personal emblem displayed prominently on the fuselage of their plane. The "Silver Fox" was most likely the Sky Clan's greatest Ace.

Media

Light novels
Toaru Hikūshi e no Koiuta started as a light novel series, written by Koroku Inumura and illustrated by Haruyuki Morisawa. The series spans five volumes which were published between February 18, 2009, and January 18, 2011, under Shogakukan's Gagaga Bunko imprint. Inumura's earlier light novel, The Princess and the Pilot, is set in the same world, as are his two later series: the two-volume Toaru Hikūshi e no Yasōkyoku and nine-volume Toaru Hikūshi e no Seiyaku.

Anime
An anime television series adaptation by TMS Entertainment began airing on January 6, 2014, on Tokyo MX. Additionally, the series is airing on Sun TV, AT-X and BS Nittele and is simulcasted in English by Crunchyroll. The series is directed by Toshimasa Suzuki, written by Shinichi Inotsume and the character designer is Hiroki Harada. The series has been licensed for release in North America by NIS America.

Episode list

Manga
A manga adaptation by Takeshi Kojima was serialized in Shogakukan's Shōnen Sunday S from February 25, 2014 to September 25, 2015 and collected into four volumes.

References

External links
 
 

2009 Japanese novels
Anime and manga based on light novels
Aviation television series
Gagaga Bunko
Light novels
Shogakukan manga
TMS Entertainment
Tokyo MX original programming
Television shows based on light novels
Shōnen manga